Valfajr is a modern homing torpedo system designed, developed, and tested by Iran's Ministry of Defence.

History 
In 2011, it was presented by the Iranian Ministry of Defence.  

Brigadier General Hossein Dehghan (Iran's defence minister) and Flotilla Admiral Habibollah Sayyari (the Commander of the Iranian regular Navy) opened the production line on 13 October 2015. In the opening ceremony, Dehghan stated that "the torpedo is capable of destroying various marine targets, including large vessels, in a few seconds."

In October 2015, Iran started mass-production of the Valfajr and has claimed that the weapon has now been upgraded with an anti-jamming system.

Capacity 
The torpedo carries an explosive warhead weighing between 220 and 300 kilograms capable of crippling naval targets in different weather and depth conditions.

See also 
 List of military equipment manufactured in Iran
 Iranian underground missile bases
 Emad (missile)
 Ghamar (3D radar)
 Fateh-313

References

External links

 Pictures of  Valfajr torpedo production line

Post–Cold War weapons of Iran
Torpedoes
Islamic Republic of Iran Navy
Military equipment introduced in the 2010s